In geometry, the triaugmented truncated dodecahedron is one of the Johnson solids; of them, it has the greatest volume in proportion to the cube of the side length. As its name suggests, it is created by attaching three pentagonal cupolas onto three nonadjacent decagonal faces of a truncated dodecahedron.

External links
 

Johnson solids